The 1955 Columbia Lions football team was an American football team that represented Columbia University as an independent during the 1955 college football season. 

In their 26th season under head coach Lou Little, the Lions compiled a 1–8 record, and were outscored 251 to 74. Manfredo Bucci was the team captain.  

This would be Columbia's final year as a football independent, as the Ivy League, which Columbia had helped co-found in 1954, began football competition in 1956. Six of the nine opponents on Columbia's 1955 schedule were Ivy League members (with Penn the only Ivy not scheduled); for decades, (future) Ivy members had comprised a large portion of Columbia's opponents.

Columbia played its home games at Baker Field in Upper Manhattan, in New York City.

Schedule

References

Columbia
Columbia Lions football seasons
Columbia Lions football